Shintsha Sithothobala was the 6th studio release by the South African isicathamiya group Ladysmith Black Mambazo. Shintsha Sithothobala, released in 1975 unlike most of the output of the group by this time, does not include any directly Zulu Christian religious songs. The album's songs instead are based on Zulu tradition.

Track listing
 "Shintsha Sithothobala"
 "Mawufunungenzenje"
 "Kudala Ngizula"
 "Bantu Radio"
 "Makoti"
 "Yinhle Lentombi" ("That Lady is Beautiful")
 "Ziyangibiza"
 "Amalanda"
 "Sicelumshado" ("We Request a Wedding")
 "Ibhubesi" ("The Lion")
 "Baleka Mfana" ("Run, Boy!")
 "Zangihlek'intombi"

References 

1977 albums
Ladysmith Black Mambazo albums